Insen (or In Sen; kanji: 陰旋; hiragana: いんせん) is a tuning scale adapted from shamisen music by Yatsuhashi Kengyō for tuning of the koto. It only differs from the hirajoshi scale by one note.

In D mode it consists of: D-E-G-A-C so it has the same notes as the Phrygian chord (7sus♭9). 

Other chords compatible with insen scale include M7♯11 when the scale is played half steps lower (for example B in sen scale for CM7♯11 chord) and Cm6 and Cm when the scale is played one full step above (for example D insen with Cm6 or Cm chord).

In India's Carnatic music, this scale corresponds to Revati.

Other scales related to koto instrument include the Hirajoshi, Iwato and Kumoi-choshi scales.

References

Further reading
Hewitt, Michael. 2013. Musical Scales of the World. The Note Tree. .

External links
 Koto Scores at sapp.org
 Insen scale at Kotobank

Pentatonic scales
Hemitonic scales